Rogers Mato (born 10 October 2003) is a Ugandan footballer who plays for Uganda Premier League club KCCA FC and the Uganda national team.

Club career
As a youth Mato played for Lweza FC and Maroons FC of the junior league. In 2018 he joined the youth setup of Proline FC of the FUFA Big League. For the 2019–20 season, Mato was promoted to the senior squad, but suffered relegation with the team during the season that was abandoned because of the COVID-19 pandemic. He became an important player for the club the following season, leading them to the promotion playoffs before coming short with a loss to Gadaffi FC. In September 2021 it was announced that the player had signed a 4-year contract with 13-time Uganda Premier League champions KCCA FC for an undisclosed fee.

International career
In September 2021 Mato was called up to the senior national team for its 2022 FIFA World Cup qualification match against Rwanda. Two months later he featured for the national side in a practice match against a representative team from the Northern Region. Mato opened the scoring as the national side went on to win 3–1. In January 2022 he was called up again for five friendlies with national sides from Europe and Asia as the Cranes traveled to Turkey, Iraq, and Bahrain. He went on to make his senior debut in the first match against Iceland on 12 January 2022. He started and played eighty minutes in the eventual 1–1 draw.

International career statistics

References

External links

KCCA FC profile

Living people

1998 births
Ugandan footballers
Uganda international footballers
Association football midfielders
2022 African Nations Championship players
Uganda A' international footballers